The 1966 Cleveland Browns season was the team's 17th season with the National Football League.
They finished just 9–5, their worst record since 1962, and failed to make the playoffs for the first time since 1963.

Season summary 
Save for a devastating 16–6 upset loss to a Pittsburgh Steelers team that would finish just 5–8–1, the Browns offense scored points in bunches. In later years, Browns players from that era said the 1966 team had the best offense—even better than the one in 1964, when the club won the NFL championship—and there's evidence to support that contention. The flurry of points started in the opener when the Browns blew out the Washington Redskins 38–14. It continued in a stretch of five straight games in which they lost 34–28 to the St. Louis Cardinals, beat the New York Giants 28–7, routed the Steelers 41–10, turned back the Dallas Cowboys 30–21 and crushed the expansion Atlanta Falcons 49–17.

Then, as they were finishing the season, the Browns outscored the Giants 49–40 and walloped the Cardinals 38–10.

The Browns scored 403 points in all, averaging a healthy 28.8 per contest. Even in the game that eventually did in their playoff chances—a 33–21 loss to the Philadelphia Eagles in the next-to-last week—they were able to score a decent number of points.
Quarterback Frank Ryan was as good – or better – than he was in any of his previous three seasons as the full-time starter, including 1964, when he helped lead the Browns to the NFL championship. He threw for a career-high 2,974 yards and had better than a 2-to-1 ratio of touchdown passes (29) to interceptions (14). He also posted his second-best quarterback rating at 88.2.

NFL draft 
The following were selected in the 1966 NFL Draft.

Exhibition schedule 

There was a doubleheader on August 26, 1966 Redskins vs Vikings and Colts vs Browns.

Regular season schedule 

Game summaries

Week 1

Week 6: at Atlanta

Week 9 at Steelers

Week 12 at Cowboys

Standings

Personnel

Roster

Staff/coaches

References

External links 
 1966 Cleveland Browns at Pro Football Reference
 1966 Cleveland Browns Statistics at jt-sw.com
 1966 Cleveland Browns Schedule at jt-sw.com
 1966 Cleveland Browns at DatabaseFootball.com  
 Season summary and stats at Cleveland Browns.com

Cleveland
Cleveland Browns seasons
Cleveland Browns